Qarah Gol (also Romanized as Qareh Gol; also known as Karakul and Qara Kūl) is a village in Aq Bolagh Rural District, Sojas Rud District, Khodabandeh County, Zanjan Province, Iran. At the 2006 census, its population was 184, in 31 families.

References 

Populated places in Khodabandeh County